Okhli-ye Pain (also Romanized as Okhlī-ye Pā’īn; also known as Okhlī-ye Paeen) is a village in Daland Rural District, in the Central District of Ramian County, Golestan Province, Iran. At the 2006 census, its population was 371, in 92 families.

References 

Populated places in Ramian County